Emerald of the East is a 1929 British adventure film directed by and featuring Jean de Kuharski. It also starred Joshua Kean, Mary Odette and Lya Delvelez. It was based on a novel by Jerbanu Kothawala. It was one of a growing number of British films to be set in India during the era.

Plot
In India, British troops attempt to rescue the kidnapped son of a Maharaja.

Cast
 Joshua Kean as Lt. Desmond Armstrong 
 Mary Odette as Nellum 
 Jean de Kuharski as Maharajah Rujani 
 Lya Delvelez as The Maharanee 
 Gillian Dean as Evelyn Gordon 
 Maria Forescu as The Chieftainess 
 Kenneth Rive as Maharaj Kumar 
 Promotha Bose as Vaghi

References

Bibliography
 Lahiri, Shompa. Indians in Britain: Anglo-Indian encounters, race and identity, 1880-1930. Frank Casss, 2000.
 Low, Rachel. The History of British Film: Volume IV, 1918–1929. Routledge, 1997.

External links

1929 films
British adventure films
1929 adventure films
Films shot at British International Pictures Studios
1920s English-language films
Films based on Indian novels
Films set in India
Films set in the British Raj
British silent feature films
British black-and-white films
1920s British films
Silent adventure films